The 2013–14 San Jose Sharks season was the club's 23rd season in the National Hockey League (NHL). The Sharks qualified for the Stanley Cup playoffs for the tenth consecutive season, but lost in the first round to the eventual Stanley Cup champion Los Angeles Kings in seven games after being up 3–0 in the series.

Standings

Schedule and results

Pre-season

Regular season

Playoffs

The Sharks entered the playoffs as the Pacific Division's second seed. They faced the Los Angeles Kings in the first round. With a 5–1 Game 7 loss, the Sharks became the fourth team in NHL history to lose a series when holding a 3–0 series lead.

Player statistics
Final stats.

Skaters

Goaltenders

†Denotes player spent time with another team before joining the Sharks.  Stats reflect time with the Sharks only.
‡Traded mid-season
Bold/italics denotes franchise record

Transactions
The Sharks have been involved in the following transactions during the 2013–14 season:

Trades

Free agents signed

Free agents lost

Players' signings

Draft picks

San Jose Sharks' picks at the 2013 NHL Entry Draft, which was held in Newark, New Jersey on June 30, 2013.

Draft notes

 The Detroit Red Wings' first-round pick went to the San Jose Sharks as a result of a June 30, 2013, trade that sent the Sharks 2013 first-round pick and a 2013 second-round pick (originally acquired from the Pittsburgh Penguins in exchange for Douglas Murray) to the Red Wings.
 The New York Rangers' second-round pick went to the San Jose Sharks as a result of an April 2, 2013, trade that sent Ryane Clowe to the Rangers in exchange for a 2013 third-round pick and this pick.
 The San Jose Sharks' second-round pick went to the Pittsburgh Penguins as a result of a June 30, 2013, trade that sent Tyler Kennedy to the Sharks in exchange for this pick.
 The San Jose Sharks' third-round pick went to the Minnesota Wild as the result of an August 7, 2011, trade that sent James Sheppard to the Sharks in exchange for this pick.
 The Chicago Blackhawks' fourth-round pick (originally from the Anaheim Ducks) and a fifth-round pick went to the San Jose Sharks in exchange for the San Jose Sharks' fourth-round pick (previously re-acquired from Chicago in exchange for Michal Handzus) and a 2014 fifth-round pick.
 The San Jose Sharks' sixth-round pick went to the Nashville Predators as the result of an April 3, 2013, trade that sent Scott Hannan to the Sharks in exchange for this pick.
 The Colorado Avalanche seventh-round pick (originally from the Anaheim Ducks) went to the San Jose Sharks as a result of a February 27, 2012, trade that sent Jamie McGinn, Mike Connolly and Michael Sgarbossa to the Avalanche in exchange for Daniel Winnik, TJ Galiardi and this pick.

References

San Jose Sharks seasons
San Jose Sharks season, 2013-14
San Jose
San Jose Sharks
San Jose Sharks